Sir Christopher Martin Dobson  (8 October 1949 – 8 September 2019) was a British chemist, who was the John Humphrey Plummer Professor of Chemical and Structural Biology in the Department of Chemistry at the University of Cambridge, and Master of St John's College, Cambridge.

Early life and education
Dobson was born on 8 October 1949 in Rinteln, Germany, where his father, Arthur Dobson was commissioned as an officer. Both Arthur Dobson and Christopher Dobson's mother, Mabel Dobson (née Pollard), were originally from Bradford in Yorkshire and had left school at age 14. Dobson had two older siblings, Graham and Gillian. Due to his father's postings, Dobson also lived in Lagos, Nigeria.

Christopher Dobson was educated at Hereford Cathedral Junior School, and then Abingdon School from 1960 until 1967. He completed a Master of Arts and Doctor of Philosophy at the University of Oxford, where he was a student of Keble College, Oxford and Merton College, Oxford.

Research and career
Dobson's research largely focused on protein folding and protein misfolding, and its association with medical disorders particularly Alzheimer's disease and Parkinson's disease. By applying chemical and biophysical techniques, Dobson investigated links between protein structure, function, and disease.

He is well known for his serendipitous discovery that ordinary proteins can misfold and aggregate to form amyloid structures.

Dobson authored and co-authored over 800 papers and review articles, including 38 in Nature, Science and Cell, which have been cited over 100,000 times.  his H-index is 153.

Dobson held research fellowships at Merton College, Oxford and then Linacre College, Oxford before working at Harvard University. He returned to Oxford in 1980 as a Fellow of Lady Margaret Hall, Oxford and as a University Lecturer in Chemistry, later receiving promotions to Reader, then Professor of Chemistry in 1996.

Dobson moved to the University of Cambridge in 2001 as the John Humphrey Plummer Professor of Chemical and Structural Biology. In 2007, he became the Master of St John's College, Cambridge, a post which he held until his death in September 2019.

In 2012, Dobson founded the Cambridge Centre for Misfolding Diseases, which is currently based in the Chemistry of Health building at the Department of Chemistry at the University of Cambridge.

In 2016, Chris Dobson co-founded Wren Therapeutics, a biotechnology start-up company whose mission is to find new therapeutics for Alzheimer's disease.

Awards and honours
Dobson was knighted in the 2018 Queen's Birthday Honours for his contributions to science and higher education. In 2009, Dobson was awarded the Royal Medal by the Royal Society "for his outstanding contributions to the understanding of the mechanisms of protein folding and mis-folding, and the implications for disease", and in 2014 he received both the Heineken Prize for Biochemistry and Biophysics and the Feltrinelli International Prize for Medicine. Dobson was elected a Fellow of the Royal Society (FRS) in 1996. His nomination reads: 

Dobson's other accolades include:

 Corday-Morgan Medal and Prize, The Royal Society of Chemistry, 1981
 Howard Hughes Medical Institute International Research Scholar, 1992
 Brunauer Award, American Ceramic Society, 1996
 Elected a Fellow of the Royal Society (FRS) in 1996
 Dewey and Kelly Award, University of Nebraska, 1997
 National Lecturer, American Biophysical Society, 1998
 Member of the European Molecular Biology Organisation (EMBO) 1999
 Interdisciplinary Award, The Royal Society of Chemistry, 1999
 Doctor Honoris Causa, University of Leuven, Belgium, 2001
 Presidential Visiting Scholar, University of California San Francisco, 2001
 Bijvoet Medal, Bijvoet Center for Biomolecular Research, University of Utrecht, The Netherlands, 2002
 Silver Medal, Italian Society of Biochemistry, 2002
 Royal Society Bakerian Lecturer, 2003
 Stein and Moore Award, The Protein Society, 2003
 Honorary Member, National Magnetic Resonance Society of India, 2004
 Elected a Fellow of the Academy of Medical Sciences (FMedSci) in 2005
 Honorary Doctor of Medicine, Umea University, Sweden, 2005
 Davy Medal, The Royal Society, 2005
 Hans Neurath Award, The Protein Society, 2006
 Honorary Doctor of Medicine, University of Florence, Italy, 2006
 Doctor Honoris Causa, University of Liège, Belgium, 2007
 Sammet Guest Professor, Johann Wolfgang Goethe University, Frankfurt, 2007
 Foreign Honorary Member of the American Academy of Arts and Sciences, 2007
 Fellow of the International Society of Magnetic Resonance, 2008
 Honorary Fellow, Linacre College, University of Oxford, 2008
 Honorary Fellow, Lady Margaret Hall, University of Oxford, 2008
 Honorary Fellow, Merton College, University of Oxford, 2009
 Honorary Fellow, Keble College, University of Oxford, 2009
 Royal Medal, The Royal Society, 2009
 Honorary Fellow of the Chemical Council of India, 2010
 Khorana Award, The Royal Society of Chemistry, 2010
 Honorary Doctorate of Science, King's College London, 2012
 Honorary Fellow, Trinity College Dublin, 2013
 Foreign Associate of the US National Academy of Sciences, 2013
 Honorary Fellow, Darwin College, University of Cambridge, 2014
 Dr. H.P. Heineken Prize for Biochemistry and Biophysics, Royal Netherlands Academy of Arts and Sciences (KNAW), 2014
 Antonio Feltrinelli International Prize for Medicine, Accademia Nazionale dei Lincei, Rome, 2014
 Member of the American Philosophical Society, 2018

Mentorship 
Dobson mentored and supervised many notable PhD students and post-doctoral researchers, many of whom became renowned experts in their own field. These include:

Carol V. Robinson at the University of Oxford
Sheena E. Radford at the University of Leeds
Cait MacPhee at the University of Edinburgh
Clare Grey at the University of Cambridge
Brenda A. Schulman at the Max Planck Institute of Biochemistry in Germany 
Michele Vendruscolo at the University of Cambridge
Fabrizio Chiti at the University of Florence

Personal life 
Dobson met his wife, Dr Mary Dobson (née Schove) at Merton College at the University of Oxford. They had two sons, Richard and William.

He died on 8 September 2019, from cancer, at Royal Marsden Hospital in Sutton, near Surrey.

References

1949 births
2019 deaths
Members of the University of Cambridge Department of Chemistry
Harvard University faculty
Fellows of Keble College, Oxford
Fellows of Lady Margaret Hall, Oxford
Fellows of Linacre College, Oxford
Alumni of Keble College, Oxford
Alumni of Merton College, Oxford
Masters of St John's College, Cambridge
Fellows of the Royal Society
Fellows of the Academy of Medical Sciences (United Kingdom)
Foreign associates of the National Academy of Sciences
British chemists
Winners of the Heineken Prize
People educated at Abingdon School
Members of the American Philosophical Society
Knights Bachelor
Bijvoet Medal recipients
Deaths from cancer in England
John Humphrey Plummer Professors